Laurence Hardy Bankart (October 16, 1887 – August 31, 1978) was an American football player and coach.  He was the head football coach at Colgate University for five seasons, in 1910 and again from 1913 until 1916, compiling a record of 28–7–3.  Bankhart's five years as coach was the longest-tenured football coach at Colgate since the first coach Samuel Colgate Jr. headed the program for three years (some sources say two) until 1929, when Andrew Kerr took over the program for 18 seasons.  Bankart was born on October 16, 1887 in Bradford, England.

Head coaching record

See also
 List of college football head coaches with non-consecutive tenure

References

1880s births
1978 deaths
Colgate Raiders football coaches
Dartmouth Big Green football players
Players of American football from Boston
Sportspeople from Bradford
British emigrants to the United States
English players of American football